() in the Army, Airborne troops, and Air Force of the Russian Federation is the designation of a member of the rank group of enlisted personnel. The rank is equivalent to matros in the Russian Navy. In the armed forces of the Soviet Union (and later in those of the Russian Federation) yefreytor is the second-lowest rank of enlisted personnel.

The word  relates to the Russian ryad, which in a military context means "file" or "rank" (in the sense of "rank and file").

History
The Imperial Russian Army used the designation  before 1917. The rank re-appeared in the newly named Soviet Army in 1946, replacing the rank of "Red Army man" used in the Red Army from 1918 to 1946.

USSR 
In the USSR Armed Forces the rank designation Ryadovoy was introduced in 1946. From 1919 to 1946 the designation to this particular rank was Krasnoarmeyets (literal: Red Army man or Red Army Soldier).

Rank insignia armed forces of the Russian Federation (RF)

Rank designation in other countries
In the countries below, spelling is similar and the classification to a separate rank group is equivalent.
 ⇒ 
 ⇒

See also
Ranks and rank insignia of the Soviet Army 1943–1955, ... 1955–1991
Ranks and rank insignia of the Russian Federation´s armed forces 1994–2010
Army ranks and insignia of the Russian Federation

References

Military ranks of Russia
Military ranks of the Soviet Union
Military ranks of Ukraine